Judith Feldman is an American television producer and writer. She worked as an executive story editor and writer for L.A. Law and was nominated for an Emmy Award for her work on the episode "Lie Harder". She went on to work as a producer and writer for Family Law and The Division. She often collaborates with Sarah Woodside Gallagher.

Awards and nominations

References

External links

American women screenwriters
American television writers
Living people
Year of birth missing (living people)
21st-century American women